Roy H. W. Johnston (11 November 1929 – 13 December 2019) was an Irish theoretical physicist and republican political activist. He was a Marxist who as a member of the IRA in the 1960s argued for a National Liberation Strategy to unite the Catholic and Protestant working classes. He wrote extensively for such newspapers as The United Irishman and The Irish Times.

Biography

His father was Joseph Johnston, a farmer, economist and historian, a fellow of Trinity College Dublin and a member of the Seanad Éireann on several occasions between 1938 and 1954. Joe Johnston was a Home Rule supporter who hailed from a small farming Ulster-Scots Presbyterian background in Tyrone.

Roy Johnston was born in Dublin in 1929. He was educated at St Columba's College, Rathfarnham, and at Trinity College Dublin (TCD).  At TCD he got a BA in experimental science and mathematics 1951, and did research in theoretical physics, getting his PhD under supervision of Cormac Ó Ceallaigh in 1955.  His PhD was called "A study of the unstable particles occurring in the cosmic radiation".

He worked in Aer Lingus as a systems analyst during the 60s and in the 1970s was head of the Applied Research Consultancy Group in Trinity College Dublin's statistics programme.  He made an oral presentation to the New Ireland Forum in 1984. He also wrote a bi-monthly science column for the Irish Times.

Political activities
Johnston was affiliated with various progressive and left-wing organisations throughout his life. As a student in Trinity he was associated with a Marxist group, the Promethean Society, which in 1948 was part of the formation of the Irish Workers’ League, eventually becoming the Communist Party of Ireland.

He moved to England and joined the Connolly Association, also being part of the Communist Party of Great Britain, returned to Ireland in 1963, and, at the invitation of Cathal Goulding, involved himself with the Wolfe Tone Society in Dublin. He joined Sinn Féin and the IRA where he became its Director of Education sitting on the Army Executive.

He contributed many articles to its newspaper the United Irishman. He was a supporter of the republican movement's move to the left with Goulding and Tomás Mac Giolla, which subsequently led to a split with the Provisionals, remaining as a member of the Official IRA after the split.

However, he left in 1972 after the assassination of Northern Ireland Senator John Barnhill and joined the Communist Party of Ireland, from which he was expelled in 1977. He was subsequently a member of the Labour Party, serving on their International Affairs Committee, and was a member of the Green Party at the time of his death.

Death
Johnston died on 13 December 2019, aged 90, at St. Vincent's University Hospital, Dublin.

Publications
Roy H. W. Johnston, Century of Endeavour: A Biographical and Autobiographical View of the Twentieth Century in Ireland (Carlow: Tyndall Publications, in association with Lilliput Press, Dublin, 2006).
 Century of Endeavour - Senator James G Douglas short biography of James G. Douglas, 1999.
 A study of the unstable particles occurring in the cosmic radiation PhD Thesis

References

External links
Science, Technology and the Nation - Some current, recent and earlier publications by Dr Roy H W Johnston - website.

1929 births
2019 deaths
Alumni of Trinity College Dublin
Irish Marxists
Irish people of Ulster-Scottish descent
Irish physicists
Irish Presbyterians
Irish Republican Army (1922–1969) members
Irish republicans
Official Irish Republican Army members
People educated at St Columba's College, Dublin
Protestant Irish nationalists
Theoretical physicists